Bravado is the third studio album by Australian musician Kirin J. Callinan. The album was released by American record label Terrible Records on 9 June 2017.

Background
The album was first announced on 26 April 2017, alongside a music video for "S.A.D.".

In an interview with Under the Radar, Callinan compared naming the album to making "a big empty statement", and that his ideas became "confusing and disorienting".

The cover of the album depicts Callinan urinating on himself.

Reception
Andrew Street of The Guardian used the phrase "kidding on the square" to describe Callinan's music, while describing the album as dazzling. Anna Gaca, writing for Spin, called the album unusual.

Canadian magazine Exclaim!, however, critiqued that the album lost focus and compared the music to mashing keys on a keyboard.

Track list

Charts

References

2017 albums
Terrible Records albums
Albums by Austrian artists